The Sioux Falls GreatLIFE Challenge was a tournament on the Symetra Tour, the LPGA's developmental tour. It was part of the Symetra Tour's schedule between 2015 and 2019. It was held at Willow Run Golf Club in Sioux Falls, South Dakota.

Winners

References

External links

Former Symetra Tour events
Golf in South Dakota
2015 establishments in South Dakota